The 2020 Sugar Bowl was a college football bowl game played on January 1, 2020, between the Georgia Bulldogs and Baylor Bears, with kickoff scheduled for 8:45 p.m. EST (7:45 p.m. local CST) on ESPN. It was the 86th edition of the Sugar Bowl, and one of the 2019–20 bowl games concluding the 2019 FBS football season. Sponsored by insurance provider Allstate, the game was officially known as the Allstate Sugar Bowl.

Teams
The game matched the Georgia Bulldogs from the Southeastern Conference (SEC) and the Baylor Bears from the Big 12 Conference. This was the fifth all-time meeting between the two programs; the Bulldogs had won each of the prior four meetings, most recently in 1989.

Georgia Bulldogs

Georgia entered the game with an 11–2 record (7–1 in conference). They finished atop the SEC's East Division and advanced to the SEC Championship Game, which they lost to LSU, 37–10. As LSU was selected to the College Football Playoff, Georgia was invited as the SEC representative to the Sugar Bowl. The Bulldogs were 3–1 against ranked opponents, defeating Notre Dame, Florida, and Auburn while losing to LSU. Their only other loss was to South Carolina.

This was Georgia's eleventh Sugar Bowl (the third-most of any team); they had a 4–6 record in prior editions of the bowl. It was also Georgia's second consecutive Sugar Bowl, following their 2018 team's loss to Texas in the 2019 edition, 28–21.

Baylor Bears

Baylor also entered the game with an 11–2 record (8–1 in conference). They finished tied with Oklahoma atop the Big 12, with the Sooners then defeating the Bears in the Big 12 Championship Game, 30–23 in overtime. As Oklahoma was selected to the College Football Playoff, Baylor was invited as the Big 12 representative to the Sugar Bowl. The Bears were 0–2 against ranked opponents, falling to Oklahoma twice.

This was Baylor's second Sugar Bowl, and their first since their 1956 team won the 1957 edition over Tennessee, 13–7.

Game summary

Statistics

References

External links
 Game statistics at statbroadcast.com

Sugar Bowl
Sugar Bowl
Sugar Bowl
Sugar Bowl
Baylor Bears football bowl games
Georgia Bulldogs football bowl games